Chthonos is a genus of South American ray spiders that was created by Jonathan A. Coddington in 1986 because the previous name was preoccupied. Originally placed with the Orb-weaver_spiders under the name Tecmessa, it was transferred to the ray spiders in 1986.

Species
 it contains five species, found in Peru, Brazil, and Ecuador:
Chthonos kuyllur Dupérré & Tapia, 2017 – Ecuador
Chthonos pectorosa (O. Pickard-Cambridge, 1882) (type) – Brazil
Chthonos peruana (Keyserling, 1886) – Peru
Chthonos quinquemucronata (Simon, 1893) – Brazil
Chthonos tuberosa (Keyserling, 1886) – Brazil

Formerly included:
C. tetrabuna (Archer, 1965) (Transferred to Ogulnius)

See also
 List of Theridiosomatidae species

References

Further reading

Araneomorphae genera
Spiders of South America
Theridiosomatidae